Lewis Maidwell (1650–1716) was an English writer and educator.

Born in Northamptonshire he attended Westminster School and graduated from Cambridge University in 1672. He ran a school on King Street in London, and was also a tutor to the sons of the wealthy politician Stephen Fox. Maidwell is noted for his repeated advocacy for the founding of an English Academy similar to the Académie Française in Paris.

He wrote the comedy play The Loving Enemies which was staged by the Duke's Company at the Dorset Garden Theatre in 1680. Maidwell was a long-standing friend of the playwright and poet laureate Nahum Tate.

References

Bibliography
 Canfield, J. Douglas. Tricksters and Estates: On the Ideology of Restoration Comedy. University Press of Kentucky, 2014.
  Hammond, Paul. The Poems of John Dryden: Volume Two: 1682-1685. Routledge, 2014.
 Spencer, Christopher. Nahum Tate. Twayne Publishers, 1972.
 Van Lennep, W. The London Stage, 1660-1800: Volume One, 1660-1700. Southern Illinois University Press, 1960.
 Ward, Adolphus William & Waller, Alfred Rayney. The Cambridge History of English Literature: From Steele and Addison to Pope and Swift. University Press, 1964.

17th-century English people
18th-century English people
17th-century English educators
18th-century English educators
English dramatists and playwrights
People from Northamptonshire
1650 births
1716 deaths